New Haven is the name of some places in the U.S. state of Wisconsin:

New Haven, Adams County, Wisconsin, a town
New Haven, Dunn County, Wisconsin, a town